The 2000 United States election in Nebraska was held on November 7, 2000. Incumbent Democratic U.S. Senator Bob Kerrey retired after two terms in office, and Democrat Ben Nelson, a former two-term governor, won the open seat. As of 2021, this is the most recent statewide election in Nebraska won by a Democrat who was not the incumbent.

Democratic primary

Candidates 
 Ben Nelson, former Governor of Nebraska and 1996 Democratic nominee for the United States Senate
 Al Hamburg, perennial candidate

Results

Republican primary

Candidates 
 Don Stenberg, Attorney General of Nebraska
 Scott Moore, Secretary of State of Nebraska
 David Hergert
 George Grogan
 John DeCamp, former State Senator
 Elliott Rustad

Results

General election

Candidates 
 Ben Nelson (D), former Governor of Nebraska and 1996 Democratic nominee for the United States Senate
 Don Stenberg (R), Attorney General of Nebraska

Debates
Complete video of debate, September 21, 2000

Results

See also 
 2000 United States Senate elections

References 

Nebraska
2000
2000 Nebraska elections